The Violin Sonata No. 1 in G major, Op. 78, "Regensonate", for violin and piano was composed by Johannes Brahms during the summers of 1878 and 1879 in Pörtschach am Wörthersee. It was first performed on 8 November 1879 in Bonn, by the husband and wife Robert Heckmann (violin) and Marie Heckmann-Hertig (piano).

Structure

Each of the three movements of this sonata shares common motivic ideas or thematic materials from the principal motif of Brahms's two songs "Regenlied" and "Nachklang", Op. 59, and this is why this sonata is also called the "Rain Sonata" (Regensonate).

The first movement, Vivace ma non troppo is written in sonata form in G major; the second movement, Adagio – Più andante – Adagio, is an expanded ternary form in E major, and the third movement, Allegro molto moderato is a rondo in G minor with coda in G major. The dotted rhythm motif from the two songs is not only directly quoted as a leading theme in the third movement of this sonata but also constantly appearing as fragmented rhythmic motif throughout the all three movements of the sonata so that the entire sonata has a certain coherency. The rhythm of the rain motif appearing in the middle section of the second movement is adapted to a funeral march. The two disruptive appearances of the main theme of the Adagio in the third movement also represent cyclic form used in this sonata.

Transcriptions

Brahms arranged the sonata (in D-major) for cello and piano. According to Janos Starker, Paul Klengel later produced an arrangement for viola.

References

Further reading

External links
 

Chamber music by Johannes Brahms
Brahms, Violin Sonata No. 1
1879 compositions
Compositions in G major